Trentanove is an Italian surname. Notable people with the surname include:

Antonio Trentanove ( 1745–1812), Italian sculptor and stucco-artist
Gaetano Trentanove (1858–1937), Italian-born American sculptor

Surnames of Italian origin